Streeter Hill is a mountain located in the Catskill Mountains of New York north-northeast of North Kortright. Middle Brook Hill is located east, Titus Hill is located north, Quaker Hill is located west-northwest, and Fan Hill is located east-southeast of Streeter Hill.

References

Mountains of Delaware County, New York
Mountains of New York (state)